Trachymetopon is an extinct genus of prehistoric coelacanth from the Jurassic of Europe. Fossils have been found in the Early Jurassic Posidonia Shale of Germany the Middle Jurassic Marnes de Dives of France, and probably the Late Jurassic Kimmeridge Clay of England. Only one species has been named, Trachymetopon liassicum, described by Henning in 1951 from an almost complete specimen found in the Lower Toarcian of Ohmden in Baden-Württemberg. Another specimen is known from the same site, and two older specimens come from the Sinemurian of Holzmaden. A giant specimen of an undetermined species of Trachymetopon found at the Middle Jurassic (Late Callovian) Falaises des Vaches Noires of Normandy. This specimen, composed of a 53 cm long palatoquadrate, belongs to an individual  in length. A study published in 2015 revealed that this coelacanth belongs to the Mawsoniidae. Trachymetopon is one of the few known mawsoniids to have been exclusively marine (with an indeterminate form from the Triassic of France), while most of the other members of the group have lived in fresh and brackish waters.

Phylogeny 
A phylogenetic analysis of the mawsoniids published in 2020 found a polytomy grouping together Trachymetopon and the Cretaceous genera “Lualabaea”, Axelrodichthys, and Mawsonia. The genus “Lualabaea” could be congeneric with Axelrodichthys.

See also

 Sarcopterygii
 List of sarcopterygians
 List of prehistoric bony fish

References

Prehistoric lobe-finned fish genera
Toarcian life
Jurassic fish of Europe
Jurassic Germany
Fossils of Germany
Posidonia Shale

Mawsoniidae